Papa Daouda Sène (born 18 November 1976) is a Senegalese footballer. He played in seven matches for the Senegal national football team in 1999 and 2000. He was also named in Senegal's squad for the 2000 African Cup of Nations tournament.

References

1976 births
Living people
Senegalese footballers
Senegal international footballers
2000 African Cup of Nations players
Place of birth missing (living people)
Association footballers not categorized by position